Ibtisam Sheikh (born 16 March 1998) is a Pakistani cricketer. He made his first-class debut for Faisalabad in the 2017–18 Quaid-e-Azam Trophy on 9 October 2017. He made his Twenty20 debut for Peshawar Zalmi in the 2018 Pakistan Super League on 22 February 2018.

References

External links
 

1998 births
Living people
Pakistani cricketers
Place of birth missing (living people)
Faisalabad cricketers
Peshawar Zalmi cricketers